Perumal Eri is a major fresh water lake in the Cuddalore district of Tamil Nadu, India.

Location: it is located almost  from Alapakkam, at latitude/longitude  and it is the second largest lake of the Cuddalore district.
      
History: when Cuddalore was under the Madurai Nayakars domine Cuddalore (Perumal Nayakan Palayam) was a range among the five ranges of its capital Tiruchirappalli. (Udayar Palayam, Marungapuri, Ariyalur, Cuddalore). It is expected that the lake was excavated during the rule of Perumal Nayakar at his Palayam as a step towards rain water conservation management.

Villages include Puduchatram, Alapakkam, Thirthanagiri, Thaanur, Samba Reddi Palayam, Aayi Thurai, Mettu Palayam, PundiaanKuppam, Kallaiyangkuppam,T.Kallaiyangkuppam, Kundiyamallur, and Aathi Narayanapuram. The overflow water is let through a water channel to the Sangolikuppam river.

References 
 
 Dina malar Daily News Paper Thursday 20 April 2017. Page 03

Lakes of Tamil Nadu
Cuddalore district